Helge Werner (23 October 1883 – 6 February 1953) was a Swedish fencer. He competed in the individual and team sabre events at the 1912 Summer Olympics in Stockholm, Sweden.

References

External links
 

1883 births
1953 deaths
Swedish male sabre fencers
Olympic fencers of Sweden
Fencers at the 1912 Summer Olympics
People from Värmland